The East Launceston Football Club was an Australian rules football club based in Launceston, Tasmania, Australia.

History
The club was founded in 1948 as "Cornwall Football Club" and participated with limited success during its 38-year tenure in the Northern Tasmanian Football Association (NTFA) competition. The club, nicknamed the Demons, changed its name to East Launceston in the late 1950s and was to play in two NTFA Grand Final's for a premiership win in 1967 and a 44-point loss to Launceston in the 1969 decider. Success was to again elude the club after this and they made their last finals appearance during the 1985 NTFA finals series.

East Launceston continued to ply their trade in the NTFA until they were announced as a shock inclusion as one of two clubs from the NTFA (the other being northern powerhouse, North Launceston) to join the new TFL Statewide League competition in January 1986. After a dismal pre-season, the Demons, who were required to adopt an alternate playing uniform and colours owing to a clash with already established club North Hobart, began their new venture at TFL level with a shock win over Hobart at KGV Football Park on the opening day (playing in a Tasmanian state training uniform). However, after three thrashings in the first seven rounds, the Demons were to record their final win in their own right over North Launceston at York Park on 18 May, but after a 99-point home loss to Glenorchy the following week, the club announced on 26 May that they would be amalgamating with fellow Launceston-based club, City-South to continue on as the South Launceston Football Club.

Summary
Home ground – York Park
Established – 1948 as Cornwall Football Club
Playing colours – Navy blue and red
Emblem – Demons
Club theme song – "It's a Grand Old Flag" (Tune: "You're a Grand Old Flag")
Affiliations – NTFA (1948–1986), TFL Statewide League (1986)

Premiership titles
NTFA premierships
1967

TFL Statewide League premierships
 Nil

Tasmanian State Premierships
Nil

Individual medal winners
Tasman Shields Trophy winners 
 1949 – Max Rees
 1961 – Eddie Thomas
 1962 – Darrell Pitcher

Hec. Smith Memorial Medal winners 
 1967 – Peter Webb
 1969 – John Burns
 1981 – Paul Reinmuth

Competition leading goalkickers
NTFA leading goalkickers 
 1957 – Roy Ringrose (50)
 1958 – Roy Ringrose (55)
 1980 – Paul Wharton (59)

TFL Statewide League leading goalkickers
 Nil

Club records
Club record score 
 22.14 (146) v City-South at York Park in 1958.

Club record games holder 
 David Thomson (206)

Club record match attendance
 10,498 – East Launceston v North Launceston at York Park for the 1967 NTFA Grand Final.

References 

Australian rules football clubs in Tasmania
Australian rules football clubs established in 1948
1948 establishments in Australia
1986 disestablishments in Australia
Sport in Launceston, Tasmania
Tasmanian Football League clubs
Australian rules football clubs disestablished in 1986